The 2006 United States Senate election in Virginia was held November 7, 2006. Incumbent Republican Senator George Allen ran for reelection to a second term but was narrowly defeated by Democrat Jim Webb, who earned 49.6% of the vote to Allen's 49.2%. With a margin of just 0.4%, this election was the closest race of the 2006 Senate election cycle. Webb declined to run for reelection in 2012.

Background 
Allen, who previously served as Governor of Virginia and was considered a possible candidate for president in 2008, was running for his second term. Webb, a decorated Vietnam War veteran, writer and former Secretary of the Navy under Ronald Reagan won the Democratic nomination after being drafted by netroots activists, such as those at the blog Raising Kaine. Polls clearly favored Allen through mid-August, but on August 11, he was filmed using the ethnic slur Macaca in reference to a Webb campaign volunteer, S.R. Sidarth, who is of Indian ancestry. He also told Sidarth, "Welcome to America and the real world of Virginia," despite the fact that Sidarth had been born and raised in Fairfax County, and was a University of Virginia student at the time. Allen denied any prejudice in the comment, but the video was quickly spread online, and the gaffe caused his lead to shrink considerably. Still, he led in most polls until late October, when several surveys showed Webb with a lead—mostly within the margin of error. The election was not decided until nearly 48 hours after the polls closed, when Allen, behind by a margin of about 0.3%, conceded on November 9, 2006. With all of the other Senate races decided, the outcome swung control of the Senate to the Democrats.

Democratic primary

Candidates 
 Harris Miller, businessman
 Jim Webb, former United States Secretary of the Navy

Endorsements

Miller 
 Kate Michelman, pro-choice activist
 Several Virginia State Senators
 Alexandria city councilmembers

Webb 
 U.S. Senator Harry Reid
 U.S. Senator Tom Daschle
 U.S. Senator Dick Durbin
 U.S. Senator Bob Kerrey
 U.S. Senator John Kerry
 U.S. Congressman John Murtha
 U.S. Congresswoman Leslie Byrne
 U.S. Congressman Owen Pickett
 General Wesley Clark, 
 Former State Delegate Chap Petersen
 Former U.S. Senator Chuck Robb and his staff

Finances 
Federal Election Commission reports show that in the first part of 2006, Miller raised more than twice as much money as Webb, who entered the race in February. (Miller contributed over $1 million to his own campaign, 60% of what he raised.)

Campaign 
The week before the primary, Miller said a Webb campaign flier characterized him in an anti-Semitic way; Webb denied that it did.

Results

General election

Candidates 
 George Allen (R), incumbent U.S. Senator and former Governor
 Gail Parker (G), Air Force veteran
 Jim Webb (D), former United States Secretary of the Navy

Controversies 

This election involved several controversies involving both Webb and Allen, most notably the "macaca incident," which began Allen's decline in the polls and eventual loss.

Platform 
Webb focused on his early and outspoken opposition to the war in Iraq, which Allen supported. In a September 4, 2002, opinion piece in The Washington Post, Webb wrote: "A long-term occupation of Iraq would beyond doubt require an adjustment of force levels elsewhere, and could eventually diminish American influence in other parts of the world." Webb's son, a U.S. Marine, served in Iraq.

Allen and Webb differed on other issues. Allen was opposed to abortion; Webb supported it. Allen supported George W. Bush's tax cuts while Webb said more of the benefits should have gone to middle-class Americans. Both candidates supported the death penalty, right-to-work laws, and Second Amendment rights.

Fundraising 
Allen retained a substantial lead in fundraising: $6.6 million on hand to Webb's $1.1 million through September 15, 2006.

Debates 
Meet the Press debate
On September 17, 2006, Allen and Webb appeared on NBC's Meet the Press for a debate. Part of the program's debate series on the midterm elections, the debate heavily discussed both the original Gulf War and the present war in Iraq. Host Tim Russert questioned Webb about his initial support for Allen's 2000 U.S. Senate run, as well as what led him to later oppose Allen. Russert also questioned Allen about a remark Webb made concerning his interactions with Allen at the start of the Iraq conflict. Webb asserted that he approached Allen regarding U.S. involvement in the region and cautioned against military action. Webb also claimed that Allen responded to this by saying "You're asking me to be disloyal to the president." After being questioned on this by Russert, Allen clarified by saying "No, it's loyalty to this country, and making sure that our country is unified in, in this, in this effort to disarm Saddam Hussein. That was the point." Allen also addressed what he saw as a weakness in Webb, claiming his opponent wanted to withdraw from Iraq. Webb clarified his belief that the U.S. has a commitment to ensure Iraq is stable before withdrawing, but also reasserted that a permanent U.S. presence in Iraq is not an option.

The debate likewise covered an upcoming vote on the use of coercive interrogation methods on enemy combatants. Allen stated that he had not yet made a decision on how to vote, but stated "Now, the key in all of this is I don't want to stop these interrogations. I'm not for torture, I'm not for waterboarding, but some of these techniques have been very helpful to us, whether they are sleep deprivation, or whether there's loud music. And I need to be absolutely certain that what the interrogations—interrogators are doing now—which is completely fine as far as I'm concerned, protecting Americans—will not be harmed by the proposal." Webb expressed that this was an issue close to him as a former soldier, but also stated that he did not believe interrogations should be ended completely. Webb however reaffirmed his concerns that if the U.S. abandons the Geneva Convention its soldiers will suffer abroad.

Russert questioned Webb on the recent allegations that his 1979 Washingtonian article fostered hostility towards female students at the Naval Academy. Webb responded as he had in prior press releases, expressing his regret for the repercussions of the article. Russert similarly asked Allen about a statement he made in 2000 in the pages of American Enterprise magazine: "If [Virginia Military Institute] admitted women, it wouldn't be the VMI that we've known for 154 years. You just don't treat women the way you treat fellow cadets. If you did, it would be ungentlemanly, it would be improper." Allen responded that VMI has made great progress in a co-ed curriculum, making women cadets more of a possibility than at the time he made the statement.
Complete video of debate, September 17, 2006

This Week debate
On September 18, 2006, George Stephanopoulos moderated a debate between Allen and Webb, as part of his program This Week on ABC. Topics included national security, Iraq, the economy, the conduct of the campaign, and other issues.
Complete video of debate, September 18, 2006

League of Women Voters debate
On October 9, 2006, the League of Women Voters sponsored a debate between Allen and Webb. The format consisted of the candidates answering series of questions from the moderator, from the LWV panel, and finally from each other. Largely, the responses from the candidates did not expand on the body of knowledge already present in their television and radio commercials. The overall feel of the debate was somewhat combative, with Allen frequently going overtime on responses and a round of uncontrolled verbal jousting after Allen cited Webb's prior statements on raising taxes.
Complete video of debate, October 9, 2006

Predictions

Polling

Results

By congressional district
Despite losing, Allen won 7 of 11 congressional districts, including one that elected a Democrat. Webb won 4, including two that elected Republicans.

Analysis 
Virginia had historically been one of the more Republican Southern states. For instance, it was the only Southern state not to vote for Jimmy Carter in 1976. Prior to the 2006 election, its congressional delegation was mostly conservative, with eight of eleven Representatives and both Senators belonging to the Republican Party, making its Congressional delegation the most Republican of any Southern state. Despite this, Democrats had won the gubernatorial races in 2001 and 2005. The state's political majority has been changing from conservative white to a mixture of races, especially Hispanic. The state is increasingly diverse; it has the highest percentage of Asians (4.7%, according to the 2005 American Community Survey of the U.S. Census) of any Southern state. 9.9% of Virginians are foreign-born. Webb, like Governor Tim Kaine in 2005, won the four major fast-growing counties in Northern Virginia outside Washington, D.C.; Fairfax, Loudoun, Prince William and Arlington. In 2008, President Barack Obama carried Virginia by a 6.3% margin over Republican Senator John McCain, while the Democratic nominee for Senate, Mark Warner, won the open seat, defeating Republican candidate Jim Gilmore by over 30 points.

When results began coming in, Allen quickly built a sizeable lead, which began to narrow as the night went on. With 90% of precincts reporting, Allen held a lead of about 30,000 votes, or about 1.5%. However, as votes began to come in from population-heavy Richmond, Webb narrowed the gap, and pulled ahead within the last 1 or 2% of precincts to report. Preliminary results showed Webb holding a lead of 8,942 votes, and many news organizations hesitated to call the election for either candidate until the next day. At 8:41 PM EST on November 8, AP declared Webb the winner. Webb was the sixth Democrat to defeat an incumbent Republican Senator in 2006, and his victory gave Democrats control of the Senate. 
In all Virginia elections, if the margin of defeat is less than half of a percentage point, the Commonwealth of Virginia allows the apparent losing candidate to request a recount, paid for by the local jurisdictions. If the margin of defeat is between one and one-half of a percentage point, the losing candidate is still entitled to request a recount, but must cover its expense.
Because the difference was less than 0.5%, George Allen could have requested a recount paid for by the government, but declined to make such a request. That was likely because:
 Even in large jurisdictions, recounts—such as those in Florida in 2000 and Washington's 2004 gubernatorial election—rarely result in a swing of more than 1,000 votes, and Allen was trailing by almost 10,000 in the initial count. In particular, almost all votes in this Virginia election were cast using electronic voting machines, whose results are unlikely to change in a recount.
 There was wide speculation that calling for a recount (and still losing) would give Allen a "sore loser" label, which would hurt his future election campaigns, including what some speculated might still involve a 2008 presidential run. However, after losing the senatorial election, on December 10, 2006, Allen announced that he would not be running for president in 2008.

See also 
 2006 United States Senate elections

References

External links 
 Meet the Press with Allen and Webb: debate video excerpts, and debate transcript
 2006 Voter's Guide by the League of Women Voters of Virginia
  Updated every 2 minutes.
 Maps & graphic displays of the 2006 Virginia election results @ www.VaElection.org
 George Allen
 Jim Webb
 Gail Parker

2006
Virginia
United States Senate